Hector Cribioli (born August 11, 1936) is an Argentinian former footballer who played as a forward.

Career 
Cribioli played with various different clubs in South America before playing abroad in 1960 in the National Soccer League with Toronto Italia. The signing of Cribioli was reflective of Italia's general manager Alan Astri's policy of foreign player recruitment. The acquisition of Cribioli ultimately played dividends for Toronto as the club secured the double (league title & NSL Championship). The team secured the NSL Championship after a series of matches against Montreal Cantalia. After the conclusion of the 1960 NSL season he played in the American Soccer League with New York Inter.

In 1961, league rivals Toronto Roma decided to increase their spending on the transfer market in order to compete with Toronto Italia over league dominance and the attention of the Italian community within the city. As a result, signed Cribiolo for the 1961 season. His spell with Roma was rather brief as he was transferred to Limoges FC of the Division Nationale on July 13, 1961, for a league record fee of $35,000. The remainder of the season he played in the Belgian First Division with R.F.C. Liege., and ultimately returned to Canada the following season  After a year hiatus he would return to play with RFC Liege in 1963 and featured in the 1963–64 Inter-Cities Fairs Cup, and 1964–65 Inter-Cities Fairs Cup.

After a short tenure in Europe he returned in 1962 to play with former club Toronto Italia this time in the Eastern Canada Professional Soccer League as the club became a charter member in 1961. In his debut season in the Eastern Canada Professional League (ECPSL) he was selected by team Italia-Roma Selects for the All-Star match and contributed a goal. He featured in the ECPSL Championship final match against Toronto City, and assisted in securing the title for Italia.

Honors 
Toronto Italia

 ECPSL Championship: 1962
 NSL Championship: 1960
 National Soccer League: 1960

References 

1936 births
Argentine footballers
Toronto Italia players
Inter SC players
Toronto Roma players
Limoges FC players
RFC Liège players
Canadian National Soccer League players
American Soccer League (1933–1983) players
Ligue 1 players
Belgian Pro League players
Eastern Canada Professional Soccer League players
Living people
Association football forwards
Expatriate footballers in Belgium
Expatriate footballers in France